Pennick is a surname. Notable people with the surname include:

Jack Pennick (1895–1964), American film actor
Nigel Pennick (born 1946), marine biologist and writer on magic
Ray Pennick (born 1946), English former footballer

See also
Penick
Penik (disambiguation)